Who We Are Instead is the fifth full-length studio album recorded by Christian rock band Jars of Clay and produced by Mitch Dane. It was released in 2003 by Essential Records.

Representing their most acoustic-based since their first disc, Who We Are Instead is the band's most relaxed-sounding material to date. The stripped-down sound accompanied a more direct focus on their spirituality, with gospel influences apparent in some of the songs and the names of God and Jesus being more explicitly mentioned throughout the disc. Guitarist Steve Mason proved to be rather versatile on this album, with several songs featuring either the lap steel or mandolin.

The songs "Show You Love" and "Sunny Days", two of the more upbeat songs on a generally contemplative and reflective album, were released as singles.

The album features two covers: The 1974 song "Lonely People" by America, and the 1971 composition "Jesus' Blood Never Failed Me Yet" by Gavin Bryars. The song "Amazing Grace" is not a cover of the popular hymn but rather an original song written by the band.

It is the band's only full-length studio album not to be nominated by either GMA Dove Awards or Grammy Awards.

Track listing

Personnel 
Jars of Clay
 Dan Haseltine – vocals, percussion 
 Charlie Lowell – acoustic piano, keyboards, organ, accordion, backing vocals 
 Stephen Mason – vocals, guitars, lap steel guitar, mandolin, National guitar, pedal steel guitar
 Matt Odmark – acoustic guitars, banjo, backing vocals 

Additional musicians

 Kenny Meeks – mandolin (5), vocals (5)
 Aaron Sands – bass (1, 6, 7, 12)
 Ken Coomer – drums (1, 2, 8, 9)
 Ben Mize – drums (1, 6, 12)
 Chris McHugh – drums (7)
 John Catchings – cello (1, 4, 8, 10, 11)
 Ashley Cleveland – vocals (2, 11)

Production

 Robert Beeson – executive producer
 Ron Aniello – producer (1, 6, 7, 12), recording (1, 6, 7, 12)
 Jars of Clay – producers (2–5, 8–11)
 Mitch Dane – producer (2–5, 8–11), recording (2–5, 8–11)
 Clint Roth – recording (1, 6, 7, 12)
 David Thoener – recording (1, 6, 7, 12)
 Jacquire King – mixing, additional engineer (7, 12), drum recording (7)
 Mike Paragone – assistant engineer (1, 6, 7, 12)
 Sang Park – assistant engineer (1, 6, 7, 12)
 Richard Dodd – mastering at RichardDodd.com, Nashville, Tennessee
 Michelle Pearson – A&R production
 Dan Haseltine – art direction
 John Rummen – cover design
 Jamie Anderson – interior design
 Martyn Atkins – band photography
 Crystal Heald – nature photography
 Hank Schiffmacher – Jesus' blood tattoo photography
 Robin Geary – hair stylist, make-up
 Star Klem – stylist

Charts

References

Jars of Clay albums
Essential Records (Christian) albums
2003 albums
Albums produced by Ron Aniello